The Hall of Great Westerners was established by the National Cowboy & Western Heritage Museum in 1958. Located in Oklahoma City, Oklahoma, U.S., the Hall was created to celebrate the contributions of more than 200 men and women of the American West. Inductees include explorers, Native American leaders, writers, poets, politicians, statesmen and others.

Members of the Hall of Great Westerners
The following are Hall of Great Westerners inductees, followed by their birth and death dates, the year they were inducted, areas of influence, and occupations.

See also
 :Category:People of the American Old West
 Hall of Great Western Performers
 Rodeo Hall of Fame

References

External links
National Cowboy & Western Heritage Museum

1955 establishments in Oklahoma
Cowboy halls of fame
Sports halls of fame
Sports hall of fame inductees
West
Awards established in 1955
Lists of sports awards
Culture of Oklahoma City
Culture of the Western United States
National Cowboy & Western Heritage Museum